Rimes: Live at Gruene Hall is a live album by American singer LeAnn Rimes. It was released on April 13, 2019 via EverLeRecords and Thirty Tigers. The project contained ten songs recorded at the Texas venue Gruene Hall. The songs incorporated various musical styles that showcased Rimes's influences over her career. The album was her first live record released in her career.

Background, content and release
LeAnn Rimes left her recording contract with Curb Records in 2013 and released a series of independent albums over the next several years. In 2019, Rimes announced that she would release her first live album project. She recorded the album at Gruene Hall, a dance venue located in New Braunfels, Texas. It was produced by Rimes herself, along with Niko Bolas and long-time collaborator Darrell Brown. The record contained a total of ten tracks and featured various musical styles. The mix of genres was intentional to showcase Rimes's appreciation for all styles of music. 

Live at Gruene Hall included Rimes's former hit songs "Blue" and "Nothin' Better to Do". It also included covers of country songs like "San Antonio Rose", "Always on My Mind" and "Streets of Bakersfield". Also featured was a cover of the pop rock song "Wonderwall" and the blue song "Pride and Joy". The disc was first released on April 13, 2019 on EverLeRecords in conjunction with the Thirty Tigers label. It was originally offered as a vinyl LP with five songs on each side of the record. It was also offered to digital markets, including Apple Music. "...with the response to the vinyl I am humbled by the fans for their positive feedback and make this a gift to everyone who couldn’t get the limited vinyl release," Rimes spoke in a press statement about the digital release.

Track listings

Vinyl version

Digital version

Personnel
All credits are adapted from the liner notes of RIMES: Live at Gruene Hall.

Technical personnel
 Niko Bolas – mixing, producer
 Eric Boulanger – mastering
 Darrell Brown – producer
 Hannah Maldon – art direction
 LeAnn Rimes – producer

Release history

References

2019 live albums
Albums produced by Niko Bolas
Albums produced by Darrell Brown (musician)
Albums produced by LeAnn Rimes
LeAnn Rimes albums
Thirty Tigers albums